Dennis Williams may refer to:

 Dennis Williams (basketball) (born 1965), American basketball player
 Dennis Williams (cricketer) (1936–2013) English cricketer and British Army officer
 Dennis Williams (ice hockey) (born 1979), Canadian ice hockey coach
 Dennis A. Williams (born 1952), former New Zealand rugby league international
 Dennis E. Williams (born 1959), Delaware state representative from the 10th district
 Dennis P. Williams (born 1953), 55th Mayor of Wilmington

See also
 Denis Williams (1923–1998), Guyanese painter, author, and archaeologist
 Denis John Williams, Welsh neurologist and epileptologist